A former managing editor of the Alberta Report, and reporter with the Edmonton Journal Lorne Gunter employed as a  Canadian columnist and editorial board member with the National Post.  He left his job at National Post to work for Sun Media in March 2012.

References

Canadian columnists
Living people
National Post people
Year of birth missing (living people)
Place of birth missing (living people)
21st-century Canadian journalists